State Route 176 (SR 176) was created in September 1980 along previous County/Secondary State Roads 81 and 89 in DeKalb County and part of County/Secondary State Road 89 in Cherokee County.

Route description

State Route 176 only follows half of that route, beginning at State Route 35 south of Fort Payne continuing west for  before forking off from Old State Route 275 at Eberhardt's Point west to the Dogtown community.  In the Dogtown community, State Route 176 (which up to that point followed former County Road 81) turns southwest at a four-way intersection along part of what had been Dekalb County Road 89.  From there, the route extends into Cherokee County to State Route 68 near Collinsville where the highway ends.  The road, however, continues south as Cherokee County Road 3 to Gadsden.

Major intersections

References

176
Transportation in DeKalb County, Alabama